Calamander or coromandel is a valuable hardwood obtained from the species Diospyros quaesita, native to India and Sri Lanka. It is also known as or variegated ebony and is closely related to genuine ebony, but is obtained from different species in the same genus. It is variegated with stripes of deep black and hazel-brown, and is very heavy and hard relative to most other woods. The name "calamander" comes from coromandel, referring to the Coromandel Coast in India from where it was first exported. It is used in carpentry, luthiery, and sculpture.

Although objects made of calamander are still extant, the trees from which the wood was obtained were logged to near-extinction, and those remaining remain a protected vulnerable species. Calamander furniture is so expensive and prized that recycling it is an unlikely proposition.

A substitute, Macassar ebony, has similar characteristics and to the untrained eye is nearly identical, though the colour lacks the depth seen in genuine calamander.

References 

Webster's Revised Unabridged Dictionary, 1913.

Wood
Diospyros